Trails, known as  in Japan, is a science fantasy series of role-playing video games. Created by Nihon Falcom, it is a part of their larger The Legend of Heroes franchise and began with the release of Trails in the Sky in 2004. The games were released exclusively in Asia until the 2010s, with Xseed Games handling its English localization and global publishing until being replaced by NIS America in 2019. Trails games primarily feature turn-based combat, with some spinoffs and later entries featuring other styles of gameplay. The series is commonly praised for its worldbuilding and character arcs. It has also seen adapted and original manga, audio drama, and anime works, with the games selling seven million copies .

Video games

Main series

Spin-offs

Other media

Notes

References

Trails
Trails
Media
Multimedia works